Gutta is the debut studio album by American rapper Ace Hood. It was released on October 14, 2008, by We the Best Music Group, Dollaz N Dealz Entertainment and Def Jam Recordings. The album debuted at number 36 on the US Billboard 200, selling 24,700 copies in its first week. The videos of "Get Him", "Ride (Remix)" and "Can't See Y'all" were released.

Singles
The album's lead single, "Cash Flow" was released on June 10, 2008. The song features guest appearances from T-Pain and Rick Ross, while it was produced by the Runners.

The album's second single, "Ride" was released on September 2, 2008. The song features guest appearance from American R&B singer Trey Songz, while the production was handled by The Inkredibles.

Track listing

Sample credits
"Gutta"— Contains a sample of "Turn the Beat Around" performed by Vicki Sue Robinson
"Fed Bound"— Contains a sample of "It's No Good For Me" performed by Johnny Nash
"Call Me"— Contains interpolates of "Hey There Lonely Girl" performed by Eddie Holman

Charts

Weekly charts

Year-end charts

References

2008 debut albums
Def Jam Recordings albums
Ace Hood albums
Albums produced by Drumma Boy
Albums produced by J.U.S.T.I.C.E. League
Albums produced by the Runners
Albums produced by the Inkredibles